The 1955 Utah State Aggies football team was an American football team that represented Utah State University in the Skyline Conference during the 1955 college football season. In their first season under head coach Ev Faunce, the Aggies compiled a 4–6 record (3–4 against Skyline opponents), placed fifth in the Skyline Conference, and outscored opponents by a total of 177 to 173.

Schedule

References

Utah State
Utah State Aggies football seasons
Utah State Aggies football